The 2019–20 K.A.S. Eupen season was the club's 75th season in existence and the 4th consecutive season in the top flight of Belgian football. In addition to the domestic league, Eupen participated in this season's edition of the Belgian Cup.

Players

Pre-season and friendlies

Competitions

Overall record

First Division A

League table

Results by round

Matches
On 2 April 2020, the Jupiler Pro League's board of directors proposed to cancel the season due to the COVID-19 pandemic. The General Assembly accepted the proposal on 15 May, and officially ended the 2019–20 season.

Belgian Cup

References 

K.A.S. Eupen
Eupen